Tobias Lars Mikaelsson (born 17 November 1988) is a Swedish footballer.

He started his professional career with Aston Villa in England in 2007. After loan spells with Ljungskile and Port Vale, he signed with Swedish side Trollhättan in 2009. Two years later he joined Ljungskile. He joined Oddevold in February 2013, before signing with Stenungsunds in January 2018. He joined Kongahälla in 2020.

Career

Aston Villa
Mikaelsson signed for Aston Villa in August 2005 from Swedish Superettan side, Ljungskile – the team he also supports. He never played a game for the Villa senior team, but made appearances at youth level and for the Reserves where he had a prolific goalscoring record. Mikaelsson was thought to have a very bright future ahead of him, some pundits had previously tipped him to become a star while he was at youth level, and follow the footsteps of his boyhood idols Zlatan Ibrahimović and Henrik Larsson. Mikaelsson joined old club Ljungskile on loan on 15 March 2007 to gain first-team experience, and he scored one goal and provided five assists in the stint. On 18 September 2007 he scored his first hat-trick for Villa Reserves – in a 4–1 victory against Derby County. In January 2008, Mikaelsson joined Port Vale on a one-month loan deal, joining up with team-mate Chris Herd. He played six games for the League One club, Vale lost four and drew two games. After Mikaelsson returned to Villa Park following an ankle injury, Vale were relegated. In July 2008, Mikaelsson was rewarded with a one-year contract extension, keeping him at the club until the summer of 2009. He had a five-day trial with BK Häcken in January 2009. In April 2009, he had an unsuccessful trial at League One Hartlepool United following release from Aston Villa.

Sweden
Mikaelsson later returned home to Sweden and signed for Trollhättan in July 2009. In his first season in the Superettan, Mikaelsson scored a single goal in 18 appearances for Trollhättan. During the 2010 season, Mikaelsson managed to score 5 goals in 29 appearances for the club, but was unable to help them avoid relegation. Mikaelsson opted to remain in the Superettan and transferred back to Ljungskile in March 2011. LSK finished in eighth place in 2011 and then in fifth place in 2012.

In February 2013, Mikaelsson signed for Division 1 Södra club IK Oddevold. The club finished second in 2013, but were beaten by Varbergs BoIS in the qualification play-offs. They finished in fifth place in 2014, fourth in 2015, and seventh in 2016. He scored two goals in 11 appearances during the 2017 season as the club finished in ninth-place. In January 2018, Mikaelsson dropped down a level to sign a two-year contract with Division 2 side Stenungsunds. The "Red Brothers" ended the 2018 season fifth in the Norra Götaland region. He signed with Division 4 side Kongahälla in 2020.

Style of play
Mikaelsson has said: "I like to think I'm an intelligent type of player with decent technique and decent pace." He is noted for his tall and powerful physique and sound technical ability.

Career statistics

References

External links

Personal Blog (in Swedish)

1988 births
Living people
Association football forwards
Swedish footballers
Swedish expatriate footballers
Expatriate footballers in England
Aston Villa F.C. players
Ljungskile SK players
Port Vale F.C. players
FC Trollhättan players
IK Oddevold players
English Football League players
Superettan players